United Support of Artists for Africa (USA for Africa) was the name under which 47 predominantly U.S. artists, led by Michael Jackson and Lionel Richie, recorded the hit single "We Are the World" in 1985. The song was a U.S. and UK number one for the collective in April of that year.

The idea started when Harry Belafonte was inspired by Band Aid's "Do They Know It's Christmas?". Belafonte then contacted Ken Kragen to recruit participants. Soon after, Quincy Jones was hired to conduct and co-produce the album.

The considerable profits from the enterprise went to the USA for Africa Foundation, which used them for the relief of famine and disease in Africa and specifically to 1983–1985 famine in Ethiopia.

USA for Africa also held a benefit event, Hands Across America, in which approximately seven million people held hands in a human chain for fifteen minutes along a path across the continental United States. Participants paid ten dollars to stand in line and the money raised was used to fight hunger and homelessness in Africa.

The combined revenues raised from the sales of "We Are the World" and Hands Across America was almost $100 million.

We Are the World album 

We Are the World, their only album, released with the following tracks:

 "We Are the World" -  (USA for Africa)
 "If Only for the Moment, Girl" -  (Steve Perry)
 "Just a Little Closer" -  (The Pointer Sisters)
 "Trapped" -  (Bruce Springsteen & The E Street Band)
 "Tears Are Not Enough" -  (Northern Lights)
 "4 the Tears in Your Eyes" -  (Prince & The Revolution)
 "Good for Nothing" -  (Chicago)
 "Total Control" -  (Tina Turner)
 "A Little More Love" -  (Kenny Rogers)
 "Trouble in Paradise" -  (Huey Lewis and the News)

Performers 

 Dan Aykroyd (The only Canadian, and one of two non-US performers)
 Harry Belafonte
 Lindsey Buckingham (of Fleetwood Mac)
 Kim Carnes
 Ray Charles
 Bob Dylan
 Sheila E.
 Bob Geldof (The only member of Band Aid, only Irishman, and one of two non-US performers)
 Hall & Oates (Daryl Hall and John Oates)
 James Ingram
 Jackie Jackson
 La Toya Jackson
 Marlon Jackson
 Michael Jackson
 Randy Jackson
 Tito Jackson
 Al Jarreau
 Waylon Jennings

 Billy Joel
 Cyndi Lauper
 Huey Lewis and the News (Sean Hopper, Bill Gibson, Johnny Colla, Mario Cipollina, and Chris Hayes)
 Kenny Loggins
 Bette Midler
 Willie Nelson
 Jeffrey Osborne
 Steve Perry
 The Pointer Sisters (Anita Pointer, June Pointer and Ruth Pointer)
 Lionel Richie
 Smokey Robinson
 Kenny Rogers
 Diana Ross
 Paul Simon
 Bruce Springsteen
 Tina Turner
 Dionne Warwick
 Stevie Wonder

Legacy 
USA for Africa has had a lasting legacy. It has been used as a symbol for the 80s and unity. Every year the group raises half a million dollars. It has been suggested that a new group similar to We Are the World 25 for Haiti be formed due to the COVID-19 pandemic. Since the death of Michael Jackson on June 25, 2009, and numerous other members it has been speculated if the group will ever reunite again.

See also 

 Band Aid – group USA for Africa was based on.
 Charity record
 Charity supergroup
 Northern Lights
 Forente Artister – Norwegian charity group of artists raising money in 1985 for Africa.
 Hear 'n Aid – a similar collaboration of heavy metal/hard rock artists in 1985 to raise money for famine relief in Africa.

References

External links 

 USA for Africa official site
 Memories and Reflections: USA for Africa's Experiences and Practices: The First 20 Years

Charity supergroups
1985 in the United States
Supergroups (music)
American pop music groups
Musical advocacy groups
1985 in international relations
Musical groups established in 1985
Michael Jackson
Lionel Richie
American supergroups